Anne Schuchat (born 1960) is an American medical doctor. She is a former rear admiral and assistant surgeon general in the United States Public Health Service Commissioned Corps. She also served as the principal deputy director of the Centers for Disease Control and Prevention (CDC). In May 2021, Schuchat stepped down from her post.

Early life and education
Schuchat grew up in a Jewish family in Washington, D.C., the fourth of five children. Her grandfather was a kosher butcher from West Virginia. Schuchat graduated with highest honors from Swarthmore College in 1980 and graduated with honors from Dartmouth Medical School in 1984.

Career

Schuchat served as resident and chief resident in internal medicine at New York University′s Manhattan V.A. Hospital before beginning her public health career at CDC as an Epidemic Intelligence Service (EIS) officer in NCID.

Having worked with the CDC on immunization, respiratory, and other infectious diseases since 1988, she served as the Interim Deputy Director for Science and Public Health at the CDC from February 2009 to June 2009. She has also held other posts in the CDC.

During the 2001 anthrax attacks, Schuchat served on CDC's Anthrax Emergency Response Team, which was tasked with investigating the attacks.

From February 2009 to June 2009, Schuchat was the Interim Deputy Director for Science and Public Health Program at the CDC, where she focused on ensuring strong science and programmatic approaches were effectively integrated into planning across the agency. She has emphasized prevention of infectious diseases in children. Her emphasis on perinatal group B streptococcal disease prevention has led to an 80 percent reduction in newborn infections and a 75 percent narrowing of racial disparities among sufferers of this infectious disease. She has been instrumental in pre- and post-licensure evaluations of conjugate vaccines for bacterial meningitis and pneumonia and in accelerating availability of these new vaccines in resource-poor countries through WHO and the Global Alliance for Vaccines and Immunization.

From January 20, 2017 through July 7, 2017, Schuchat served as Acting Director of the CDC (and as acting Administrator for the Agency for Toxic Substances and Disease Registry) and again from January 31, 2018 through March 26, 2018, when she was succeeded by Robert R. Redfield as Director.

Schuchat has been active in the CDC's efforts to combat the 2020 Coronavirus outbreak in the United States. In a February 25, 2020  HHS briefing on the "China coronavirus" she famously stated "It’s very important to say that our efforts at containment so far have worked, and the virus is actually contained here in the United States."  A May 1, 2020 CDC report authored by Schuchat noted that based on this containment belief federal and local jurisdictions did not recommend restrictions on gatherings, and that several large events consequently held at the end of February played a notable role in the spread of COVID-19 in the United States.

In popular culture
 The fictional character of Erin Mears in the 2011 film Contagion is partially based on Schuchat and her career. British actress Kate Winslet, who portrays the character, consulted with Schuchat in the process of preparing for the role.

Personal life
Schuchat is married and has no children; she has three brothers and one sister. In May 2005, Schuchat received an honorary doctorate in science from Swarthmore College, from which she graduated in 1980.

Awards and decorations
 2005: Swarthmore College, Honorary Doctorate in Science
 American Public Health Association, Maternal and Child Health Young Investigator Award
 United States Public Health Service, USPHS Physician Research Officer of the Year

United States Public Health Service Commissioned Corps

Selected works and publications

References

External links

20th-century American Jews
American public health doctors
Women public health doctors
Geisel School of Medicine alumni
Living people
People from Washington, D.C.
Swarthmore College alumni
United States Public Health Service Commissioned Corps admirals
Centers for Disease Control and Prevention people
1960 births
Directors of the Centers for Disease Control and Prevention
Obama administration personnel
Trump administration personnel
21st-century American Jews
Members of the National Academy of Medicine